Cuballing is a town located in the Wheatbelt region of Western Australia, on Great Southern Highway, between Pingelly and Narrogin. At the 2021 census, Cuballing had a population of 456.

History
The name is of Aboriginal origin and was first recorded in a lease application in 1868 relating to a pool near the town, and was previously spelt "Cubballing" or "Cooballing". The townsite was gazetted in 1899 and was one of the original stations on the Great Southern Railway. By 1903, a school and district hall had been appointed and the town had its own Road Board (later to become the Shire Council in 1961), and by 1906, two butcher shops, two banks, a hall, a post office, a coffee house, two blacksmiths, two churches, a boarding house and a hotel served the town's population. Many of these buildings have been preserved and can still be seen today.

However, the town did not grow after the 1920s, presumably due to the size and economic opportunity in nearby Narrogin, and in 1946 the primary school closed, meaning pupils had to travel to neighbouring towns.

References

External links

 Shire of Cuballing

Towns in Western Australia
Wheatbelt (Western Australia)